Happily Ever After was the last album by Canadian rock act Rose Chronicles. It was released in 1996 by Nettwerk Records.

Track listing
All songs written by Cochrane/Maranda/Thirsk/Van Der Woerd.

 "Bruise" (3:43)
 "Vicious Thorn" (3:27)
 "Blood Red" (4:51)
 "Voice in Jail" (4:34)
 "Breath Is a Dagger" (3:31)
 "Torn" (5:12)
 "Ornament" (5:26)
 "Acquiesce" (5:33)
 "Heaven Tide" (6:35)
 "Thrown to the Sand" (2:52)
 "Krayon" (3:55)
 "Spill" (5:15)
 "Lovely Psycho" (7:29)

Personnel

Rose Chronicles 

 Richard Maranda - Guitars
 Judd Cochrane - Bass
 Steve van der Woerd - Drums and Percussion
 Kristy Thirsk - Voice and Words

Guests 

 Trevor Grant - Drums on "Krayon"
 Howard Redekop - Bass on "Krayon"

Production 

 Produced by Kevin Hamilton, Vincent Jones and Rose Chronicles.
 Engineered by Kevin Hamilton.
 Mixed by Kevin Hamilton, Mike Plotnikoff and Greg Reely.
 Mastered by George Marino.
 Design by John Rummen.
 Photography by Adina Shore.

1996 albums
Rose Chronicles albums